Hiidenkivi was a magazine which featured articles on culture, history, language and literature. The magazine existed between 1994 and 2012 and was headquartered in Helsinki, Finland.

History and profile
Hiidenkivi was founded by Elina Grundström in 1994. The first issue appeared on 28 January that year. Grundström was given the Finnish State Award for Public Information for her founding of the magazine in 1995. Hiidenkivi was affiliated with the Institute for the Languages of Finland. 
In fact, the institute was its publisher with other organizations. In 2010 the magazine started its website. 

From January 2009 to December 2012 the editor-in-chief of Hiidenkivi was Outi Lauhakangas. The magazine ceased publication in December 2012.

References

1994 establishments in Finland
2012 disestablishments in Finland
Cultural magazines
Defunct literary magazines published in Europe
Defunct magazines published in Finland
Finnish-language magazines
History magazines
Literary magazines published in Finland
Magazines established in 1994
Magazines disestablished in 2012
Magazines published in Helsinki